1978–79 was the sixty-sixth occasion on which the Lancashire Cup completion had been held.
 
Widnes won the trophy  by beating Workington Town by the score of 15-13

The match was played at Central Park, Wigan, (historically in the county of Lancashire). The attendance was 10,020 and receipts were £6,261.00

After relatively little success in the competition, Workington Town had reached the semi-final stage in 1973, 1974 and 1975, had been runner-up in 1976, winner in 1977, and now runners-up again in 1978. They would go on to be runners-up again in 1979.

Background 

The total number of teams entering the competition remained at last season’s total of 14 with  no junior/amateur clubs taking part.

The same fixture format was retained, but due to the number of participating clubs, this resulted in one  “blank” or “dummy” fixture in the first round, and one bye in the second round.

Competition and results

Round 1 
Involved  7 matches (with one “blank” fixture) and 14 clubs

Round 1 – First replays 
Involved  1 match and 2 clubs

Round 1 – Second replays 
Involved  1 match and 2 clubs

Round 2 - Quarter-finals 
Involved 3 matches (with one bye) and 7 clubs

Round 3 – Semi-finals  
Involved 2 matches and 4 clubs

Final

Teams and scorers 

Scoring - Try = three points - Goal = two points - Drop goal = one point

The road to success

Notes and comments 
1 * Central Park was the home ground of Wigan with a final capacity of 18,000, although the record attendance was  47,747 for Wigan v St Helens 27 March 1959

See also 
1978–79 Northern Rugby Football League season
Rugby league county cups

References

External links
Saints Heritage Society
1896–97 Northern Rugby Football Union season at wigan.rlfans.com 
Hull&Proud Fixtures & Results 1896/1897
Widnes Vikings - One team, one passion Season In Review - 1896-97
The Northern Union at warringtonwolves.org

RFL Lancashire Cup
Lancashire Cup